Saint-Rémi is a city in the province of Quebec, Canada. Located on the south-shore of the Saint Lawrence River and the Island of Montreal. Saint-Rémi is part of Les Jardins-de-Napierville Regional County Municipality, in the Montérégie administrative region. The population as of the 2021 Canada Census was 8 957.

Name

The territory was known as Saint-Rémi early into the European settling. It is thought that the name was chosen to honor Daniel de Rémy de Courcelle, Governor General of New France from 1665 to 1672, but this fact is still in doubt today.

History

At the start of the 19th century, Lord Christophe Sanguinet experienced legal disputes with the British colonial administration and after two trials in 1805 and 1807, the territory of the Lordship of La Salle was reduced by 20% of its area, the most developed by being removed. He and his successors, his son Ambroise Sanguinet and his grandsons Christophe-Ambroise and Charles-Amable Sanguinet tried to recover this part of the territory while interceding so that the hundreds of threatened censitaires were not expelled from their lands. Christophe-Ambroise and Charles-Amable Sanguinet took up the cause of the Lower Canada Rebellion and were hanged in 18392.

Saint-Rémi is located in the former seigneury of La Salle and on the former township of Huntigndon. The origin of the name Saint-Rémi comes from Saint Remigius, bishop of Reims, who baptized the king of the Salian Franks Clovis I in 496. It was in 1815 that the first pioneer, Alexis Perras, arrived. On 1 July 1825, the parish municipality of Saint-Rémi was officially created.

On 23 October 1859, the village of Saint-Rémi was constituted by detachment from the parish of the same name.

In 1975, the municipal councils of the city of Saint-Rémi and the parish of the same name adopted a by-law authorizing the granting of letters patent to merge the two municipalities into one City of Saint-Rémi.

Demographics 

See also
 Les Jardins-de-Napierville Regional County Municipality
 Saint-Pierre River (Saint-Régis River tributary)
 List of cities in Quebec

References

External links
 
 Saint-Rémi official website

Cities and towns in Quebec
Incorporated places in Les Jardins-de-Napierville Regional County Municipality

Populated places established in 1815